The Official Politically Correct Dictionary and Handbook is a book written by Henry Beard and Christopher Cerf. It was published in 1992 by Villard Books in New York, by Grafton in London, and, by Random House of Canada Limited in Toronto. An updated edition was published in 1994.

It was a bestseller that was called "tongue in cheek", "outrageously funny", "hilariously rewarding for people who have not read any non-humorous works on its subject and who enjoy satire", and has been called "thoroughly sourced".

See also 
 Campaign Against Political Correctness
 Politically Correct Bedtime Stories
 Politically Incorrect

References

Further reading 

The Official Politically Correct Dictionary and Handbook. Villard Books. 1992. .
"peak guide" The New Review of the Low Pay Unit, Issues 1-20, p 19 
Peter Newmark. "PC" (November 1993) reprinted in More Paragraphs on Translation. Topics in Translation Series. Multilingual Matters. 1998. . Page 52.
Tom Aitken. "Past a Joke". The Tablet. 27 March 1993. p 18.
"Look it up in your tree carcass". Baltimore Sun. 9 November 1993.
Lauren Lipton. "A Cerebrally Deprived Notion". LA Times. 8 May 1992.

1992 non-fiction books
English dictionaries
Books by Henry Beard
Collaborative non-fiction books